Lieurey is a commune in the Eure department in Normandy in northern France.

Population

International relations

The 14 communes of the former canton of Saint-Georges-du-Vièvre (Normandy, France), including Lieurey, are twinned with Slimbridge (Gloucestershire, England).

See also
Communes of the Eure department

References

Communes of Eure